The Chernigov Governorate (translit.: Chernigovskaya guberniya), also known as the Government of Chernigov, was a guberniya in the historical Left-bank Ukraine region of the Russian Empire, which was officially created in 1802 from the Malorossiya Governorate with an administrative centre of Chernihiv. The Little Russian Governorate was transformed into the General Government of Little Russia and consisted of Chernigov Governorate, Poltava Governorate, and later Kharkov Governorate.

Chernigov Governorate borders are roughly consistent with the modern Chernihiv Oblast, but also included a large section of Sumy Oblast and smaller sections of the Kyiv Oblast of Ukraine, in addition to most of the Bryansk Oblast, Russia.

Administrative division
The governorate consisted of 15 uyezds (their administrative centres in brackets):
 Borznyansky Uyezd (Borzna)
 Glukhovsky Uyezd (Glukhov/Hlukhiv)
 Gorodnyansky Uyezd (Gorodnya/Horodnia)
 Kozeletsky Uyezd (Kozelets)
 Konotopsky Uyezd (Konotop)
 Krolevetsky Uyezd (Krolevets)
 Mglinsky Uyezd (Mglin)
 Nezhinsky Uyezd (Nezhin/Nizhyn)
 Novgorod-Seversky Uyezd (Novgorod-Seversky/Novhorod-Siverskyi)
 Novozybkovsky Uyezd (Novozybkov)
 Ostyorsky Uyezd (Ostyor/Oster)
 Sosnitsky Uyezd (Sosnitsa/Sosnytsia)
 Starodubsky Uyezd (Starodub)
 Surazhsky Uyezd (Surazh)
 Chernigovsky Uyezd (Chernigov/Chernihiv)

The Chernigov Governorate covered a total area of 52,396 km², and had a population of 2,298,000, according to the 1897 Russian Empire census. In 1914, the population was 2,340,000. In 1918 it became part of Ukraine and transformed into Chernihiv Governorate.

Principal cities
Russian Census of 1897
 Nezhin –  (Ukrainian – , Jewish – , Russian – )
 Chernigov –  (Ukrainian – , Jewish – , Russian – )
 Konotop –  (Ukrainian – , Jewish – , Russian – )
 Novozybkov –  (Russian – , Jewish – , Belorussian – 303)
 Glukhov –  (Ukrainian – , Jewish – , Russian – )
 Borzna –  (Ukrainian – , Jewish – , Russian – 109)
 Starodub –  (Russian – , Jewish – , Ukrainian – 133)
 Krolevets –  (Ukrainian – , Jewish – , Russian – 209)
 Berezna –  (Ukrainian – , Jewish – , Russian – 144)
 Novgorod-Seversky –  (Ukrainian – , Jewish – , Russian – )
 Mglin –  (Russian – , Jewish – , Belorussian – 75)
 Sosnytsia –  (Ukrainian – , Jewish – , Russian – 158)
 Korop –  (Ukrainian – , Jewish – 865, Russian – 77)
 Oster –  (Ukrainian – , Jewish – , Russian – 399)
 Kozelets –  (Ukrainian – , Jewish – , Russian – 468)
 Pogar –  (Russian – , Jewish – , Germans – 6)
 Gorodnya –  (Ukrainian – , Jewish – , Russian – 604)
 Surazh –  (Jewish – , Belorussian – 978, Russian – 559)
 Novoye Mesto –  (Russian – , Jewish – 67)

Language

By the Imperial census of 1897. In bold are languages spoken by more people than the state language.

See also
 List of governors of Chernigov Governorate

References and notes

External links

 Chernigov Guberniya – Article in Brockhaus and Efron Encyclopedic Dictionary 
 Chernigov Governorate – Historical coat of arms 
 Chernihiv gubernia – Article in the Encyclopedia of Ukraine

 
Governorates of Ukraine
Governorates of the Russian Empire
Political history of Ukraine
1802 establishments in the Russian Empire
1918 disestablishments in Russia
History of Chernihiv Oblast
History of Sumy Oblast
History of Bryansk Oblast